A Killing Kindness is a 1980 crime novel by Reginald Hill, the sixth novel in the Dalziel and Pascoe series.

Publication history
1980, London: Collins Crime Club , Pub date 24 November 1980, Hardback

1980 British novels
Novels by Reginald Hill
Collins Crime Club books
British detective novels